Belanovica is a town in Serbia. It is situated in the Ljig municipality, in the Kolubara District. The population of the town is 199 people (2011 census). Its geographical coordinates are 44° 14' 51" North, 20° 23' 48" East.

References

External links
 www.belanovica.rs 

Populated places in Kolubara District